Lara Dashti (born 24 January 2004 in Kuwait City) is a Kuwaiti swimmer. 

In the 2020 Summer Olympics, Dashti was one of Kuwait's flagbearers along with shooter Talal Al-Rashidi, and was the first woman to carry Kuwait's flag at any Olympics.  Dashti took part in the women's 50m freestyle.

References

External links
 

2004 births
Living people
Kuwaiti female freestyle swimmers
Olympic swimmers of Kuwait
Swimmers at the 2020 Summer Olympics